Pleasant Lake extends through southern Otisfield into northern Casco, Maine. The lake shoreline is heavily developed with residences and seasonal cabins. It is one of the finest spring fed lakes in the state of Maine. The southern end of the lake overflows as Mill Brook through the village of Casco, and reaches the Crooked River  to the southwest. The lake supports a thriving population of white perch with some smallmouth bass and chain pickerel; and has been stocked with brown trout, lake trout, and land-locked Atlantic salmon. A boat launch area is available at the southern end of the lake.

Seeds of Peace, an international conflict resolution summer camp, is based on Pleasant Lake.

Sources

Lakes of Cumberland County, Maine
Lakes of Oxford County, Maine
Seeds of Peace
Casco, Maine
Otisfield, Maine
Lakes of Maine